Prof. Rajendra Singh (Rajju Bhaiya) University (PRSU), formerly  Allahabad State University, is a state university located in Allahabad, Uttar Pradesh, India. Established in 2016, it has jurisdiciton over the four districts of the Allahabad division.

History 
Allahabad State University was established through the Uttar Pradesh State Universities (Amendment) Act, 2013, which saw to establish a state university in Allahabad since the University of Allahabad was given the status of central university, leaving the district with no state university. The act gave the university jurisdiction over the colleges in the four districts of Allahabad division, Allahabad, Kaushambi, Fatehpur and Pratapgarh, previously affiliated to Chhatrapati Shahu Ji Maharaj University and Dr. Ram Manohar Lohia Avadh University. However, due to difficulties in transferring the land, the construction of the university was delayed until 2016, when it was announced on the 2016 budget that funds were assigned and the land was identified for the university, leading to the official date of establishment on 17 June 2016. In 2018, following the renaming of Allahabad to Prayagraj, proposals were made to rename the university as well. In 2019 the university was renamed after Rajendra Singh through an ordinance, which was later that year replaced by the Uttar Pradesh State Universities (Amendment) Act, 2019.

The first vice-chancellor VC of the university was Rajendra Prasad, who was originally appointed Officer on Special Duty (OSD) for the establishment of the university. Prasad was replaced by Sangeeta Srivastava in June 2019. Srivastava resided until November 2020, when she was appointed VC of Allahabad University and replaced with K.N. Singh, which took the position as an additional charge. In March 2021 Akhilesh Kumar Singh took charge as VC.

References

External links
 Official website

Allahabad
Universities in Uttar Pradesh
Educational institutions established in 2016
2016 establishments in Uttar Pradesh